The 2022–23 Zamalek SC season is the club's 112th season in existence and the 64th consecutive season in the top flight of Egyptian football. In addition to the domestic league, Zamalek are participate in this season's editions of the Egypt Cup, the EFA Cup and the CAF Champions League.

Overview 
In the first game of the year, Zamalek was defeated surprisingly 2–1 by Aswan. This was only their second loss to the home team.

Players

First-team squad

Out on loan

Players under contract

Transfers

In

Out

Pre-season and friendlies

Competitions

Overall record

Egyptian Premier League

League table

Results summary

Results by round

Matches 
The league fixtures were announced on 9 October 2022.

Egypt Cup

EFA Cup

CAF Champions League

Qualifying rounds 

The draw for the qualifying rounds was held on 9 August 2022.

First round

Second round

Group stage 

The draw for the group stage was held on 12 December 2022.

Statistics

Appearances and goals

|-
! colspan=14 style=background:#dcdcdc; text-align:center| Goalkeepers

|-
! colspan=14 style=background:#dcdcdc; text-align:center| Defenders

|-
! colspan=14 style=background:#dcdcdc; text-align:center| Midfielders

|-
! colspan=14 style=background:#dcdcdc; text-align:center| Forwards

|-
! colspan=14 style=background:#dcdcdc; text-align:center| Players transferred out during the season

|-

Goalscorers

Last updated: 29 January 2023

Notes

References

Zamalek SC seasons
Zamalek
Zamalek